Penrhyn Castle was launched in 1807 in Bangor. She sailed to the Baltic and three times suffered survivable maritime mishaps. She was finally wrecked on 4 September 1823.

Career
Penrhyn Castle first appeared in the supplementary pages in Lloyd's Register (LR) in 1808.

On 7 April 1816 the snow Penrhyn Castle, Griffith, master, came in to Cowes having lost her mast and having sustained other damage.  

Penrhyn Castle, Laird, master, was driven ashore 30 November 1816 on Birker Island, Russia. She was on a voyage from London to Pillau, Prussia. Most of her cargo was saved. She had sustained little damage. She was refloated on 19 December and taken in to Pillau.

A strong gale drove Penrhyn Castle, Nutting, master, ashore on 31 October 1817 some 20 miles from Strömstad, Sweden. Once again, she had sustained little damage and it was expected that she would be gotten off once she had been lightened. She was on a voyage from London to Pillau, Prussia.

Fate
Penrhyn Castle was wrecked on 4 September 1823 on the coast of Newfoundland while sailing from Quebec City to Halifax, Nova Scotia.  took her cargo, soldiers' clothing, from Newfoundland to Quebec.

Citations

1807 ships
Age of Sail merchant ships of England
Maritime incidents in 1816
Maritime incidents in 1817
Maritime incidents in September 1823